Nipania may refer to:
Nipania, Begusarai, village in Bihar, India
Nipania, Purnia, village in Bihar, India